The Russian Basketball Super League 1, or Super Liga 1,, formerly known as the Russian Basketball Super League A or the Russian Basketball Super Liga A, is a men's professional basketball league that was the pre-eminent league of Russian professional basketball until 2010. Currently, it is the second-tier division of the Russian professional basketball pyramid. The league is run by the Russian Basketball Federation (RBF).

History
After being the first-tier division of Russian basketball, from its first season in 1991–92, the Super League A was relegated to being the second-tier division of Russian basketball after the 2009–10 season, and was replaced with a different first-tier league, starting with the 2010–11 season of the Russian Professional Basketball League (PBL). The successor league to the Super League 1 was not controlled by the Russian Basketball Federation (RBF), like the Super League 1 is, but by a separate body named the Professional Basketball League (PBL).

From the 2010–11 season onward, the Super League A and Super League B (the previous second division of the Russian basketball pyramid) divisions were united into a single league that serves as the second tier of Russian basketball, named the Super League 1. The 2010–11 season featured 11 clubs.

Clubs 2021/2022 
BC Samara
Runa Basket Moscow
Temp-SUMZ Revda
Irkut Irkutsk
Uralmash Yekaterinburg
Universitet Yugra Surgut
Novosibirsk
Barnaul
Ufimets Ufa
Khimki
CSKA Moscow-2
Dome Springs Izhevsk
MBA Moscow
Lokomotiv Kuban 2
Dynamo Vladivostok

Super League A (first-tier league) champions 1992-2010

 1991–92  CSKA Moscow
 1992–93  CSKA Moscow
 1993–94  CSKA Moscow
 1994–95  CSKA Moscow
 1995–96  CSKA Moscow
 1996–97  CSKA Moscow
 1997–98  CSKA Moscow
 1998–99  CSKA Moscow
 1999–00  CSKA Moscow
 2000–01  Ural Great

 2001–02  Ural Great
 2002–03  CSKA Moscow
 2003–04  CSKA Moscow
 2004–05  CSKA Moscow
 2005–06  CSKA Moscow
 2006–07  CSKA Moscow
 2007–08  CSKA Moscow
 2008–09  CSKA Moscow
 2009–10  CSKA Moscow

Super League 1 (second-tier league) champions 2011-present
 2011 Spartak Primorye
 2012 Ural Yekaterinburg
 2013 Ural Yekaterinburg
 2014 Avtodor Saratov
 2015 Novosibirsk
 2016 PSK Sakhalin
 2017 Universitet Yugra Surgut
 2018 BC Spartak Primorye
 2019 BC Samara
 2020  not awarded
 2021 BC Samara 
 2022 Ural Yekaterinburg

Super League A (first-tier league) regular season winners 1992-2010
 1995 CSKA Moscow
 1996 CSKA Moscow
 1997 Avtodor Saratov
 1998 Avtodor Saratov
 1999 CSKA Moscow
 2000 CSKA Moscow
 2001 Ural Great Perm
 2002 Ural Great Perm
 2003 CSKA Moscow
 2004 CSKA Moscow
 2005 CSKA Moscow
 2006 CSKA Moscow
 2007 CSKA Moscow
 2008 CSKA Moscow
 2009 CSKA Moscow
 2010 CSKA Moscow

Super League 1 (second-tier league) regular season winners 2011-present
 2011 Universitet Yugra Surgut
 2012 Ural Yekaterinburg
 2013 Universitet Yugra Surgut
 2014 Avtodor Saratov
 2015 Samara SGEU
 2016 PSK Sakhalin
 2017 Novosibirsk
2018 BC Samara
2019 Vostok-65
2020 Spartak Primorye

Russian basketball clubs in European and worldwide competitions

Awards

See also 
 Russian Cup
 Russian Professional Championship
 USSR Cup
 USSR Premier League
 VTB United League
PBL 2010-13

References

External links 
 Russian Basketball Federation Official Website 
 Russian Super League 1 on Eurobasket.com

Russian Basketball Super League
Basketball leagues in Russia
Rus
Sports leagues in Russia
Professional sports leagues in Russia